The EF55-200mm refers to two telephoto zoom lenses produced by Canon. They are of the EF lens mount that is compatible with the EOS line of cameras.

The two versions are:
4.5-5.6
4.5-5.6 II

Lenses

References
EF55-200mm f/4.5-5.6 USM at the Canon Camera Museum
EF55-200mm f/4.5-5.6 II USM at the Canon Camera Museum

55-200mm